5-3-443 may refer to:

A formation in association football (soccer)
A card game, also called 3-2-5

Established by Nikolaos Alefanfos